Saeed Hanaei or Said Hanai (1962 – April 8, 2002) was an Iranian serial killer.

Personal life
Hanaei was born in 1962. He had a dysfunctional relationship with his mother, who violently abused him; he later claimed that she frequently scratched him with her fingernails hard enough to draw blood, and attempted to bite off pieces of his flesh.

At the time of his murders, he was married and had three children. He was a construction worker by profession, and served as a volunteer in the Iran-Iraq war.

Crimes
Hanaei targeted female prostitutes in the eastern city of Mashhad. He often targeted drug addicts.

The murders were referred to as the "spider killings" by the Iranian press because Hanaei lured the women to his home and strangled them and dumped their bodies. He killed 16 women between August 2000 and July 2001, when he was apprehended by the police.

The murders were the following:

 On August 7, 2000, Afsaneh Karimpour, a 30-year-old woman who had a 9-year-old daughter, disappeared.
 On August 10, a woman named Layla was found strangled beneath the Khin-e-Rab Road of Mashhad near some tomato bushes.
 On August 11, in the Sagradeshahr neighbourhood of Mashhad, the body of a woman named Fariba Rahimpur was discovered in a yellow burlap sack. She too had been strangled.
 On January 3, 2001, near the Iran Khodro Company in Mashhad, a woman named Massoumeh was found dead.
 On February 16, in front of Iran Khodro, the body of 27-year-old Sarah Rahmani was discovered in a veil.
 On February 29, the strangled body of 45-year-old Azam Abdi was discovered near the Khin-Arab road.
 On March 19, the body of 50-year-old Sakineh Kayhanzadeh was discovered in northeastern Mashhad. Her body had been wrapped up in black cloth.
 On March 23, the body of another woman, Khadijeh Full Qasri, who had been strangled with a scarf, was found in the village of Dustabad near Mashhad.
 On April 12, on the edge of the road to Quchan, near the Shahid Fahmidah Square and Khane Ara road, the body of 35-year-old Marzieh Saadatyan was discovered in a veil.
 On April 14, the body of a 35-year-old strangled woman named Maryam was found wrapped up in a veil.
 The following day, the body of another 35-year-old woman named Touba was found in a similar position.
 On April 24, the body of 31-year-old Azra Hajizadeh was discovered on the North Khayyam Street in Mashhad.
 On July 3, the body of Maryam Beygi, 28, was discovered at the Shaheed Mosavi Boulevard in Mashhad, along with the bodies of two women named Shiva and Zahra. All three were strangled.
 On July 11, the body of a 20-year-old strangled woman named Leila was found in Mashhad.
 On July 24, the body of 18-year-old Mahboube Allah was discovered on Quchan's old road.
 In August, the body of 33-year-old Zahra Dadkhosravi, the last victim of the so-called by the media "Spider Killer", was found.

Motives
After his arrest, Hanaei claimed that he was trying to cleanse the city of moral corruption, and that God approved of his "work". He claimed in court that he began killing the sex workers after his wife was mistaken for one.

Reactions
Following Hanaei's arrest, some religious hardliners excused, and even praised, his crimes, arguing that he had tried to "cleanse" Iran of moral corruption.

"Who is to be judged?" wrote the conservative newspaper Jomhuri Islami. "Those who look to eradicate the sickness or those who stand at the root of the corruption?" Such sentiments were expressed by the killer's merchant friends at the Mashhad bazaar, one of whom said, "He did the right thing. He should have continued."

Execution
Hanaei was found guilty and hanged at dawn on April 8, 2002 in Mashhad Prison.

In popular culture
The incident was the subject of the 2002 documentary And Along Came a Spider, directed by Maziar Bahari, and it includes an interview with Hanaei. In 2020, a film called Killer Spider was directed by Ebrahim Irajzad starring Mohsen Tanabandeh as Saeed and Sareh Bayat as Saeed's wife. In 2022, another film about his life, Holy Spider, was released, starring Zar Amir Ebrahimi and Mehdi Bajestani, and directed by Ali Abbasi. It was filmed in Jordan, and entered the main competition section of the 2022 Cannes Film Festival.

See also
List of serial killers by country
List of serial killers by number of victims

References

External links 
 
 

1962 births
2002 deaths
21st-century executions by Iran
Crimes against sex workers
Executed Iranian people
Executed Iranian serial killers
Iranian people convicted of murder
Male serial killers
People convicted of murder by Iran
People executed by Iran by hanging
People executed for murder
Violence against women in Iran